Ab Mu-ye Olya (also Romanized as Āb Mū-ye ‘Olyā and Ābmū ‘Olyā; also known as Āb Mow) is a village in Tayebi-ye Garmsiri-ye Jonubi Rural District, in the Central District of Kohgiluyeh County, Kohgiluyeh and Boyer-Ahmad Province, Iran. At the 2006 census, its population was 18, in 7 families.

References 

Populated places in Kohgiluyeh County